Lucie Oršulová (born 18 January 1975) is a Czech ski mountaineer and mountain climber. She is member of the SAC Špindlerúv Mlyn as well as member of the national team. Professionally she is attorney at law.

Selected results 
 2003:
 10th, European Championship team race (together with Kamila Bulířová)
 2004:
 4th, World Championship relay race (together with Alice Korbová and Kamila Bulířová)
 9th, World Championship vertical race
 2005:
 10th, European Championship team race (together with Alice Korbová)

References 

1975 births
Living people
Czech female ski mountaineers
Czech mountain climbers
Czech women lawyers
Place of birth missing (living people)
21st-century Czech lawyers